2003 Harding, provisional designation , is a carbonaceous Eoan asteroid from the outer regions of the asteroid belt, approximately 18 kilometers in diameter. It was discovered during the Palomar–Leiden survey on 24 September 1960, by astronomers Ingrid and Cornelis van Houten at Leiden, and Tom Gehrels at Palomar, California. The asteroid was later named after astronomer Karl Ludwig Harding.

Orbit and characterization 

The asteroid is a member of the Eos family. Orbiting the Sun at a distance of 2.7–3.4 AU once every 5 years and 4 months, the asteroid's path is nearly coplanar to the plane of the ecliptic with an orbital inclination of less than 2 degrees. It has a short rotation period of three hours.

The survey designation "P-L" stands for Palomar–Leiden, named after Palomar Observatory and Leiden Observatory, which collaborated on the fruitful Palomar–Leiden survey in the 1960s. Gehrels used Palomar's Samuel Oschin telescope (also known as the 48-inch Schmidt Telescope), and shipped the photographic plates to Ingrid and Cornelis van Houten at Leiden Observatory where astrometry was carried out. The trio are credited with the discovery of several thousand asteroid discoveries.

Naming 

The asteroid is named after German astronomer Karl Ludwig Harding (1765–1834), who discovered the minor planet 3 Juno. He is also honored by the lunar crater Harding. The official  was published by the Minor Planet Center on 15 October 1977.

References

External links 
 Asteroid Lightcurve Database (LCDB), query form (info )
 Dictionary of Minor Planet Names, Google books
 Asteroids and comets rotation curves, CdR – Observatoire de Genève, Raoul Behrend
 Discovery Circumstances: Numbered Minor Planets (1)-(5000) – Minor Planet Center
 
 

002003
Discoveries by Cornelis Johannes van Houten
Discoveries by Ingrid van Houten-Groeneveld
Discoveries by Tom Gehrels
6559
Named minor planets
19600924